Nanette is a 1940 German musical film directed by Erich Engel and starring Jenny Jugo, Hans Söhnker and Albrecht Schoenhals.

The film's sets were designed by the art directors Karl Haacker and Karl Weber.

Cast
 Jenny Jugo as Nanette Dürwaldt
 Hans Söhnker as Alexander Patou
 Albrecht Schoenhals as Georg Miller
 Olga Limburg as Frau Klose
 Hans Schwarz Jr. as Gustav
 Flockina von Platen as Schauspielerin
 Siegfried Breuer as 1. Schauspieler
 Hans Stiebner as Julius, Wirt
 Anton Pointner as 2. Schauspieler
 Karl Hannemann as Bühnenportier
 Dolly Raphael as Kassiererin
 Annemarie Korff as Sekretärin
 Günther Markert as Sekretär
 Emmy Wyda as Ältere Dame
 Henry Lorenzen as Inspizient
 Heinrich Troxbömker as Polizeirichter
 Viktor Carter as Junger Mann

References

Bibliography
 Bock, Hans-Michael & Bergfelder, Tim. The Concise CineGraph. Encyclopedia of German Cinema. Berghahn Books, 2009.

External links 
 

1940 films
1940 musical films
German musical films
Films of Nazi Germany
1940s German-language films
Films directed by Erich Engel
German black-and-white films
1940s German films